Jhalrapatan is one of the 200 Legislative Assembly constituencies of Rajasthan state in India. It is in Jhalawar district and is a segment of Jhalawar–Baran (Lok Sabha constituency).

Jhalrapatan has returned the State's former Chief Minister, Vasundhara Raje, as MLA (Member of the State's Legislative Assembly) on behalf of the Bharatiya Janata Party four times .

Member of Legislative Assembly

Election results

2018

2013

2008

See also
List of constituencies of the Rajasthan Legislative Assembly
Jhalawar district

References

Jhalawar district
Assembly constituencies of Rajasthan